The Five Thousand Year Leap: Twenty-Eight Great Ideas That Are Changing the World is a book that was published in 1981 by American Mormon author and member of the John Birch Society's speaker bureau W. Cleon Skousen. The book asserts that the United States prospered because it was established upon universal natural law principles that had been passed down from common law and traditional Judeo-Christian morality, as many of the Founding Fathers had been guided by the Bible, among others. Thus, the U.S. Constitution incorporates enlightened ideas.

Criticism

Princeton University historian Sean Wilentz disputes the book's claims on taxes, the redistribution of wealth, the separation of church and state, and the "In God We Trust" motto. Wilentz describes The 5,000 Year Leap as "a treatise that assembles selective quotations and groundless assertions to claim that the US Constitution is rooted not in the Enlightenment but in the Bible and that the framers believed in minimal central government." Wilentz categorically disputes those assertions:

Wilentz acknowledges that the Founding Fathers rejected what Samuel Adams denounced as "utopian schemes of leveling," but he notes that some of the Founding Fathers were quite pragmatic when it came to policy specifics.

See also
 The Naked Communist

References

External links 
 Nationallibertyalliance.org provides an abridged paper

Political science books
1981 non-fiction books
Books by W. Cleon Skousen